Reginald Hubert Potts (3 January 1892 – 21 March 1968) was a British gymnast who competed in the 1912 Summer Olympics. He was on the British team, which won the bronze medal in the gymnastics men's team, European system event in 1912. In the individual all-around competition he finished 32nd.

References

External links
Reginald Potts' profile at databaseOlympics
Reginald Potts' profile at Sports Reference.com

1892 births
1968 deaths
British male artistic gymnasts
Gymnasts at the 1912 Summer Olympics
Olympic gymnasts of Great Britain
Olympic bronze medallists for Great Britain
Olympic medalists in gymnastics
Medalists at the 1912 Summer Olympics